Thirunalur  is a village in the Aranthangi revenue block of Pudukkottai district, Tamil Nadu, India.

Short history :  

Thirunalur village consists of two villages namely South and North. In between these south north villages are the beautiful greenish fields of paddy owned by the villagers.  

River Agni flows south and north of the paddy fields. near the river, the auspicious Sri Pozhinjiyaman, who builds and protects the people of these villages, resides in the temple. He has incarnated as a powerful god of this region. Thirunalur also has Pozhinjiamman temple, Mariyamman and Ayyanar temples. to know more details about Thirunalur Pozinjiamman Temple click here.

Demographics 

 census, Thirunalur had a total population of 4285 with 2088 males and 2197 females. Out of the total population 2710 people were literate.

References

Villages in Pudukkottai district